See Mercedes-Benz SL-Class for a complete overview of all SL-Class models.

The Mercedes-Benz W 113 is a two-seat roadster/coupé, introduced at the 1963 Geneva Motor Show, and produced from 1963 through 1971. It replaced both the 300 SL (W 198) and the 190 SL (W 121 BII). Of the 48,912 W 113 SLs produced, 19,440 were sold in the US.

The W 113 SL was developed under the auspices of Mercedes-Benz Technical Director Fritz Nallinger, Chief Engineer Rudolf Uhlenhaut and Head of Styling Friedrich Geiger. The lead designers were Paul Bracq and Béla Barényi, who created its patented, slightly concave hardtop, which inspired the "Pagoda" nickname.

All models were equipped with an inline-six cylinder engine with multi-port fuel injection. The bonnet, boot lid, door skins and tonneau cover were made of aluminum to reduce weight. The comparatively short and wide chassis, combined with an excellent suspension, powerful brakes and radial tires gave the W 113 superb handling for its time. The styling of the front, with its characteristic upright Bosch "fishbowl" headlights and simple chrome grille, dominated by the large three-pointed star in the nose panel, paid homage to the 300 SL roadster.

W 113 SLs were typically configured as a "Coupe/Roadster" with a soft-top and an optional removable hardtop. A 2+2 was introduced with the 250 SL "California Coupe," which had a fold-down rear bench seat instead of the soft-top.

History
By 1955, Mercedes-Benz Technical Director Prof. Fritz Nallinger and his team held no illusions regarding the 190 SL's lack of performance, while the high price tag of the legendary 300 SL supercar kept it elusive for all but the most affluent buyers. Thus, Mercedes-Benz started evolving the 190 SL on a new platform, model code W127, with a fuel-injected 2.2 liter M127 inline-six engine, internally denoted as 220SL. Encouraged by positive test results, Nallinger proposed that the 220SL be placed in the Mercedes-Benz program, with production commencing in July 1957.

However, while technical difficulties kept postponing the production start of the W127, the emerging new S-Class W 112 platform introduced novel body manufacturing technology altogether. This led to the W 113 platform, with an improved fuel-injected 2.3 liter M127 inline-six engine and the distinctive "pagoda" hardtop roof, designated as 230 SL.

The 230 SL made its debut at the Geneva Motor Show in March 1963, where Nallinger introduced it as follows: "It was our aim to create a very safe and fast sports car with high performance, which despite its sports characteristics, provides a very high degree of traveling comfort".

Designed-in safety 
The W 113 was the first sports car with a "safety body," based on Bela Barényi's extensive work on vehicle safety: It had a rigid passenger cell and designated crumple zones with impact-absorbing front and rear sections built into the vehicle structure. The interior was "rounded," with all hard corners and edges removed, as in the W 111 sedan.

The W 113 was also the first Mercedes-Benz with radial tires.

Models

230 SL (1963-1967)

Production of the 230 SL commenced in June 1963 and ended on 5 January 1967. The dual-circuit brake system had front disc brakes and power-assisted rear drum brakes. The 230 SL was offered with a 4-speed manual transmission, or an optional, very responsive fluid coupled (no torque converter) 4-speed automatic transmission, which was popular for US models. From May 1966, the ZF S5-20 5-speed manual transmission was available as an additional option, which was particularly popular in Italy. Of the 19,831 230 SLs produced, less than a quarter were sold in the US.

A fuel injection pump with six plungers instead of two was fitted, which allowed placing the nozzles in the cylinder head and "shooting" the fuel through the intake manifold and open valves directly into the combustion chambers. An optional oil-water heat exchanger was also available.

Mercedes-Benz Chief Engineer Rudolf Uhlenhaut demonstrated the capabilities of the 230 SL on the tight three-quarter mile Annemasse Vétraz-Monthoux race track in 1963, where he put up a best lap time of 47.5 seconds vs. 47.3 seconds by Grand Prix driver Mike Parkes on his 3-liter V12 Ferrari 250 GT.

A brief chronology of the most notable changes made to the 230 SL:

 10/1963: First 230 SL with automatic transmission.
 09/1964: Spare tire well removed, tire mounted horizontally.
 11/1964: Optional tinted/thermal glass and new soft-top with steel bows (distinguished by missing chrome trim on the outer trailing edge).
 04/1964: US models with radio Becker Europa TR instead of Europa TG.
 08/1965: Some harmonization with new W 108/W 109 sedans, incl. new floor panels, combined brake and clutch fluid reservoir, boot light and interior changes. US models with hazard lights.
 03/1966: Mounts for three-point seat belts added.
 05/1966: Optional ZF 5-speed manual transmission; rare and now very desirable.

250 SL (1966–1968)

The 250 SL was introduced at the 1967 Geneva Motor Show. Production had already commenced in December 1966 and ended in January 1968. The short one-year production run makes the 250 SL the rarest of the W 113 series cars. The 250 SL retained the stiffer suspension and sportier feel of the early SLs, but provided improved agility with a new engine and rear disc brakes. Like its predecessor, the 250 SL was offered with a 4-speed automatic transmission, and 4-speed or ZF 5-speed manual transmissions. For the first time, an optional limited slip differential was also available. Of the 5,196 250 SLs produced, more than a third were sold in the US.

The main change was the use of the  M129.II engine with  increased stroke,  increased valve ports, and seven main bearings instead of four.

California Coupé
The 250 SL also marked the introduction of a 2+2 body style, the so-called "California Coupé", which had only the removable hardtop and no soft-top: a small fold-down rear bench seat replaced the soft-top well between passenger compartment and boot.

Midlife improvements
In August 1967, a number of additional changes were incorporated to accommodate stricter safety regulations and US emission laws. The safety improvements included a collapsible steering wheel and padded wheel hub, concave control knobs, elastic black rubber heater levers (instead of rigid coloured translucent plastic), and softer, rounded dash top padding. Door handles, locks, and window cranks were modernized and less protruding, the door pockets were elastic, the rear-view mirror frame was black plastic instead of chrome, and the side view mirrors became more angular. Essentially, the 1967 250 SL retained the more classic "chrome" interior of the 230 SL, whereas the 1968 250 SL introduced the modernized "safety" interior of the 280 SL.

US models acquired side reflectors on the fenders, Kangol three-point seat belts, an illuminated automatic gearbox shift quadrant, and emission control equipment. The chrome horn ring was changed to matte finish.

280 SL (1967–1971)

The 280 SL was introduced in December 1967 and continued in production through 23 February 1971, when the W 113 was replaced by the entirely new and substantially heavier R107 350 SL. Over the years, the W 113 evolved from a sports car into a comfortable grand tourer, and US models were by then usually equipped with the 4-speed automatic transmission and air conditioning. Manual transmission models came with the standard 4-speed or the optional ZF 5-speed, which was ordered only 882 times and thus is a highly sought-after original option today. In Europe, manual transmissions without air conditioning were still the predominant choice. Of the 23,885 280 SLs produced, more than half were sold in the US.

The main change was an upgrade to the  M130 engine with  maximum power and  maximum torque, which finally gave the W 113 adequate power. This mandated an oil-cooler, which was fitted vertically next to the radiator. Each engine was now bench-tested for two hours prior to being fitted, so their power specification was guaranteed at last.

The M130 marked the final evolution of Mercedes-Benz' venerable SOHC M180 inline-six, before it was superseded by the entirely new DOHC M110 inline-six introduced with R107 1974 European 280 SL models. For some time, it was also used in the W 109 300 S-Class, where it retired the expensive 3 liter M189 alloy inline-six.

A brief chronology of the most notable changes made to the 280SL:

 12/1967: One piece wheel-covers (like W 108/W 109 sedans).
 10/1968: US models with sealed beam headlights without fog lights.
 02/1969: New tail lights with amber turn signals.
 05/1969: ZF 5-speed manual transmission discontinued as listed option and available only on special request.
 07/1969: US models with headlight assembly with full amber lower section, illuminated side markers, transistorized ignition, and improved emission control.
 08/1969: Heated rear window for hardtop, hazard lights for all models, single master key for all locks.
 04/1970: Bosch Lichteinheit headlights optionally with halogen main beam (distinguished by "flat" instead of "bubble" lens).
 08/1970: Fuchs alloy wheels available as a factory-fitted option.
 11/1970: Opaque beige plastic coolant expansion tank (instead of satin-black paint over brass). New door locks: cylinder can be depressed while door is locked.

North American models

North American models have a number of subtle differences, the most obvious one being the distinctive "sealed beam" bulb headlights required in the US versus the Bosch Lichteinheit headlights for the rest of the world. 1970 US models also acquired amber turn-signal lenses on the rear lights, later than most other countries.

Other differences of the North American models include imperial gauges, chrome bumper guards, side reflectors (illuminated from 1970), lower rear-axle ratios for faster acceleration yet lower top speeds, and no "single-side" parking lights. In the US, automatic transmission, air conditioning, and white wall tires were much more popular than elsewhere.

European cars were popular as US gray-market imports: those vehicles were brought to the US some years after their original delivery in Europe. Early European imports had aftermarket hazard lights and Kangol seat belts fitted, US safety requirements that were adopted in Europe only in later production years.

Special versions

Pininfarina Coupe

While the original design by Paul Bracq is highly regarded today, it was more controversial at the time of its introduction. So in 1963, Pininfarina asked the Mercedes-Benz board to produce its own custom-bodied version of the 230 SL. Pininfarina's Tom Tjaarda turned the roadster into a fixed-head coupe that vaguely resembled the Ferrari 250 GT Lusso. He retained the grille and headlamps of the original, but raked the grille more sharply, sculpted the wings, and made the sides more bulbous and thus wider, while making the bonnet narrower and shorter. The rear was reminiscent of the Ferrari 330 GT 2+2 (also a Tjaarda design), but without taking away the distinctive personality of the 230 SL. Inside, Tjaarda left the dashboard unchanged, but the interior as a whole exuded the stamp of elegant Italian hand craftmanship. The result was appealing but not convincing enough to go into production and remained a one-off, subsequently acquired by German press baron Axel Springer.

W 113/12
Mercedes-Benz Chief Engineer Rudolf Uhlenhaut liked pushing the power envelope of his cars. In 1965, he fitted a 250 SL with the massive   M100 V8 engine from the Mercedes-Benz 600. This engine conversion gave the car, denoted as W 113/12, impressive power, but made it very front-heavy, so that this direction was abandoned. The car was eventually destroyed, the usual procedure for test vehicles at the time.

Frua Shooting Brake
In 1966, the Turin coachbuilder Pietro Frua, a prominent car designer in Italy in the 1960s, presented a coach built 230 SLX Shooting Brake version of the 230 SL.

R 113 W 33-29
In 1968, Mercedes-Benz fitted a 280 SL with a  M50F Wankel engine, denoted as R 113 W 33-29.

Timeline
The model timeline and production numbers are:
{| class="wikitable" style="text-align:center; width:50em"
|+ Production numbers.
|-
!Model|| Chassis || Engine || || 1963 || 1964 || 1965 || 1966 || 1967 || 1968 || 1969 || 1970 || 1971 || || Total || US
|-
!| 230 SL
| W113.042 || 2.3L M127.II I6 || || 1,465 || 6,911 || 6,325 || 4,945 || 185
| colspan="4" | || || 19,831 || 4,752
|-
!| 250 SL
| W113.043 || 2.5L M129.II I6 || 
| colspan="3" | || 17 || 5,177 || 2
| colspan="3" | || || 5,196 || 1,761
|-
!| 280 SL
| W113.044 || 2.8L M130 I6 ||
| colspan="4" | || 143 || 6,930 || 8,047 || 7,935 || 830 || || 23,885 || 12,927
|-
| colspan="13" | || || 48,912 || 19,440'|}

Motorsports
Spa-Sofia-Liège Rally
In 1963, Eugen Böhringer won the 6,600-kilometre Spa-Sofia-Liège Rally (Belgium to Bulgaria) on a race-modified 1963 230 SL. This vehicle was thought to have been destroyed for a long time, but turned up at a collector's house a few years ago. A newly build Replica is now in the permanent collection of the Mercedes-Benz Museum in Stuttgart Untertürkheim, Germany. On 14 September 1963, Dutch Grand Prix racer Carel Godin de Beaufort took second place in class in the Vaals hill climb in a stock 230SL.

In 1964, Mercedes-Benz entered a modified 230 SL for Eugen Böhringer/Klaus Kaiser into the Spa-Sofia-Liège Ralley. These car had special 2.6 liter engine ( Probably  with pairwise cylinder casts, a layout that was later adopted for M130 engine of the 280 SL) . The 230 Sl from the previous Year was driven by Dieter Glemser/Martin Braungart, but did not finish. Also entered 2 W111 220 SE Limousines for Ewy Rosqvist/Manfred Schiek, who come 6th  and Rolf Kreder/Alfred Kling, who did not finish .Due to considerable mechanical bad luck, Eugen Böhringer finished only third this time, after Rauno Aaltonen on Austin-Healey 3000 and Erik Carlsson on Saab.

Acropolis Rally
In 1965, Dieter Glemser entered the Acropolis Rally on a light-weight 230 SL similar to the Spa-Sofia-Liège cars. His tuned 2.3 liter engine produced , further evidence to the fact that 230 SL production engines rarely met their power specification. Unfortunately, Glemser was given wrong directions by the police, costing him his comfortable lead and relegating him to third place.

In media
Magazines
 The Belgian webzine Gentlemen's Corner listed the W 113 among its 20 "Most stylish cars of the past 50 years".
 GQ listed the W 113 among the "Ten cars that made Mercedes-Benz".
 David Gandy of Vogue.com listed the W 113 as one of his "15 favorite cars".
 The Daily Telegraph put the W 113 on its list of "The 100 most beautiful cars" of all time.

Top Gear
On the British automotive TV show Top Gear'' (Season 3, Episode 8) the 280 SL is thought of highly, notably being described by the host at the time, Jeremy Clarkson, as one of the cars from the 1960s that has stood the test of time, being "from a time when Mercedes was still building its cars properly."

Technical data

Famous owners
Prominent owners of the W113 (mainly 280 SL) included Juan Manuel Fangio (230SL), Charlton Heston, David Coulthard (midnight blue (904G) 1971 280 SL), Tony Curtis, Walt Disney, John Lennon (dark blue (332G) 1965 230 SL, which was for sale for $495,000 in 2011), John Travolta (havana brown (408G) 1970 280 SL), which was stolen in September 2011, Kate Moss (metallic blue (387H) 280 SL), Nico Rosberg, Peter Ustinov, Sophia Loren, Stirling Moss), Colin Powell, Priscilla Presley (a gift from her then-husband, Elvis Presley, her 1969 white convertible 280SL is at Graceland on permanent display) and John Gutfreund.

See also
 Mercedes-Benz SL-Class

References

Notes

Bibliography

General

Workshop manuals

External links

Curbside Classic: 1963 Mercedes-Benz 230SL – Big Shoes To Fill – a retrospective of the W113
 Bollywood's Love for Car's

W113
W113
Roadsters
Coupés
Cars introduced in 1963
1970s cars